Nagaybaksky (masculine), Nagaybakskaya (feminine), or Nagaybakskoye (neuter) may refer to:
Nagaybaksky District, a district of Chelyabinsk Oblast, Russia
Nagaybaksky (rural locality), a rural locality (a settlement) in Chelyabinsk Oblast, Russia